Gustav Weinkötz (17 December 1912 – 28 March 1986) was a German athlete. He competed in the men's high jump at the 1936 Summer Olympics.

References

1912 births
1986 deaths
Athletes (track and field) at the 1936 Summer Olympics
German male high jumpers
Olympic athletes of Germany
Sportspeople from Mannheim